Cephalion (Greek: Κεφαλίων) may be:
Cephalion, son of Amphithemis and the nymph Tritonis.
Cephalion (historian), Roman historian of the time of Hadrian